is a former Japanese football player.

Playing career
Ikeda was born in Niigata Prefecture on July 8, 1977. After graduating from high school, he played for his local club Albirex Niigata. However he did not play much and retired at the end of the 1999 season.

Club statistics

References

External links

1977 births
Living people
Association football people from Niigata Prefecture
Japanese footballers
J2 League players
Albirex Niigata players
Association football midfielders